The Ultimate Aircraft 10 Dash is a Canadian single-seat sport and aerobatic biplane designed and built by Ultimate Aircraft Corporation of Guelph, Ontario.

Design and development
The 10 Dash Model 100 was designed as sport biplane that could be either bought assembled or for amateur construction from either plans or a kit. The first prototype 10 Dash 100 first flew on 6 October 1985. It is a braced biplane with wooden wings,  a welded steel tube fuselage, fixed conventional landing gear with a tailwheel and a single open cockpit. An aerobatic variant, the 10 Dash 200, is powered by a 180-200 hp engine. The 10 Dash 300 has a longer fuselage and longer-span wings with full-span symmetrical ailerons. A tandem two-seat variant, the 20 Dash 300, also joined the family.

Variants
10 Dash 100
Basic single-seat sport variant.
10 Dash 200
Single-seat aerobatic variant.
10 Dash 300
Higher-power single-seat competition variant.
20 Dash 300
Tandem two-seat variant with a single-piece bubble canopy.

Specifications (10 Dash 300)

See also

References

Notes

Bibliography 

1980s Canadian sport aircraft
Homebuilt aircraft
Single-engined tractor aircraft
10 Dash
Aerobatic aircraft
Biplanes
Aircraft first flown in 1985